Kellow is a surname of British origin; it may be from a Cornish place called Kellow; or in some cases from places called Kelloe in County Durham or Berwickshire.

Kellow may refer to:

 Rodrigo Salton as Kellow, a Brazilian DJ, Musician and Producer
 Alison Kellow, an Australian botanist
 Brian Kellow (1959-2018), American biographer and magazine editor
 Geoffrey Kellow, an Australian philatelist
 Kellow Chesney (1914–2004), a journalist
 Kellow House, an historic building in Cresco, Iowa
 Tony Kellow (1952–2011), an English professional footballer

References